Bernhard Lund can refer to:

 Bernhard Lund (footballer)
 Bernhard Lund (sailor)